Rasmikeyevo (Räsmäkäy) is a rural locality (a village) in Maysky Selsoviet, Iglinsky District, Bashkortostan, Russia. The population was 118 as of 2010. There are 2 streets.

Geography 
Rasmikeyevo is located 56 km northeast of Iglino (the district's administrative centre) by road. Kazayak-Kutush is the nearest rural locality.

References 

Rural localities in Iglinsky District